Dock Bridge is a pair of vertical lift bridges crossing the Passaic River at Newark, Essex County and Harrison, Hudson County, New Jersey, United States, used exclusively for railroad traffic. Also known as the Amtrak Dock Vertical Lift, it carries Amtrak, NJ Transit, and PATH trains. It is listed on the state and federal registers of historic places.

History
The bridge was built by the Pennsylvania Railroad (PRR) for its main line. The west span carries three tracks and opened in 1935 along with the west half of Newark Penn Station. The east spans opened in 1937 when the Hudson and Manhattan Railroad (H&M, later called PATH) shifted its rapid transit trains from the Centre Street Bridge to the newly built station. With the opening of the eastern span, the PRR closed Manhattan Transfer station in the Kearny Meadows, where previously steam and electrical trains were changed and passengers could transfer to trains to New York Penn Station on the PRR or to Hudson Terminal on the H&M.

Description
The west span carries three tracks exclusively used by Amtrak and NJ Transit for Northeast Corridor intercity and commuter traffic between Newark and New York City. The east span carries two PATH tracks used by PATH's Newark-World Trade Center service and one NEC track shared by Amtrak and NJ Transit. Due partly to its use of the Dock Bridge, PATH is legally a commuter railroad under the jurisdiction of the Federal Railroad Administration even though it has long operated as a rapid transit system.

It is infrequently lifted and, prior to 2014, had not received a request for a river traffic opening since 2004. In 2011 regulations were changed so that it need not be open on demand (as it previously had) but with a 24-hour notice. During four-year removal of dredged materials from the Passaic the bridge is expected to open upwards of 10 times per day. In 2020 Amtrak requested that bridge remain in closed position until such time as it can be rehabilitated.

See also
 Gateway Project, regional transportation improvement project
 List of crossings of the Lower Passaic River
 List of bridges, tunnels, and cuts in Hudson County, New Jersey
 List of NJT movable bridges
 National Register of Historic Places listings in Essex County, New Jersey
 List of bridges on the National Register of Historic Places in New Jersey

References

External links

Dock Bridge at Bridges & Tunnels
Dock Drawbridge and Interlocking Tower at Wikimapia

Bridges completed in 1935
Bridges in Hudson County, New Jersey
Buildings and structures in Hudson County, New Jersey
Bridges in Newark, New Jersey
Harrison, New Jersey
Transportation in Newark, New Jersey
Railroad bridges in New Jersey
Vertical lift bridges in New Jersey
Amtrak bridges
PATH (rail system)
Pennsylvania Railroad bridges
NJ Transit bridges
Railroad bridges on the National Register of Historic Places in New Jersey
Bridges over the Passaic River
National Register of Historic Places in Essex County, New Jersey
National Register of Historic Places in Hudson County, New Jersey
Drawbridges on the National Register of Historic Places
Rapid transit bridges
New Jersey Register of Historic Places
1935 establishments in New Jersey